Le Boulou is a commune in the Pyrénées-Orientales department in southern France.

It is situated 12 km from the Spanish border.

Geography

Localisation 
The town of Le Boulou is located in the canton of Vallespir-Albères and in the arrondissement of Céret, in the south of Pyrénées-Orientales.

Toponymy 
The name of the town in catalan is El Voló.

History 

In the 10th century, the territory of Le Boulou appears to be shared between the lord of Saint-Jean-Pla-de-Corts, lady Minimilla, and the church of Elne. Le Boulou is then ruled by the lords of Montesquieu from the 11th to the 14th centuries. It finally becomes part of the crown lands.

At the end of the 17th century, Bernard de Kennedy, following the court of James II of England in France, decides to settle in Le Boulou and receives French citizenship from Louis XIV of France. His grandson, Côme de Kennedy, is granted a title of lord of Le Boulou in 1755. Côme's son, Joseph de Kennedy is the running lord during the French Revolution. But his house is used as a headquarter by the Spanish general Antonio Ricardos during the first battle of Boulou in 1793. Accused of betrayal, Joseph de Kennedy is sent to the guillotine on 2 May 1794, on the next day after the second battle of Boulou.

In the 20th century Le Boulou was the site of a camp housing female Republican escapees from Spain at the end of the Spanish Civil War. It was opened as a clearing centre, but there was no shelter and most of the women and children were removed to other parts of France, along with some wounded soldiers. During the German occupation the spa at Le Boulou was a Gestapo headquarters.

Government and politics

Mayors

Population

Culture

See also
Communes of the Pyrénées-Orientales department

References

Communes of Pyrénées-Orientales